Root Film is an adventure visual novel video game by Kadokawa Games. The game is a spiritual successor to 2016's Root Letter visual novel and the second entry in the Kadokawa Mystery Games series. The game released on the Nintendo Switch and PlayStation 4 in Japan in July 2020, and on March 19, 2021 in North America and Europe.

Gameplay
The game plays as a murder mystery visual novel; much of the game is spent reading text to advance the story. When the player is ready to accuse a suspect, a fighting video game-styled segment ensues. Other segments include mini-games where inconsistencies must be fixed and stories put together into a narrative, similar to aspects of the Danganronpa and Ace Attorney series of games.

Story
Similar to its predecessor, Root Letter the game's fictional story takes place in the real-life Shimane Prefecture in Japan. The story follows dual protagonists; Rintaro Yagumo, an aspiring but poor film director, and Riho, an up-and-coming actress who hasn't quite had her breakthrough yet. In the game, a TV series called "Shimane Mystery Drama Project" has been green lit, and both Rintaro and Riho are excited this could be their breakthrough roles. However, a real life murder mysteriously occurs on the set very early on in the process and puts things to a halt, and the two, along with various other crew involved try to find out what happened.

Development
The game is generally considered a sequel or successor to the Root Letter visual novel, grouped together by what is called the Kadokawa Games Mystery series moniker. The two game's stories are unrelated and unconnected, but share thematic similarities, and many voice actors, to give a feeling of a running series. Sequel ideas for Root Letter were being considered as early as late 2016. The game's existence as a formal project was known as early as October 2018, when it was announced under its tentative name Root Letter 2. The game was formally revealed and announced under its official name, Root Film, a year later in October 2019.

The game was originally scheduled for release on April 23, 2020 in Japan, but received a short delay to July 30, 2020. The game was announced for an English localization in September 2020, with an intended Q1 2021 release date, later solidified down to March 19, 2021. A limited edition version of the game was also announced for its Western release, which includes a 100 page art booklet packaged with the physical copy of the game.

Reception
Root Film received an 8/8/8/8 (32/40) rating from Japanese magazine Famitsu. However, the game did not fare well on the Japanese video game charts; the PS4 version debuted at number 30 in the top 30 selling video games of the week, moving 1679 copies, and the Switch version charting somewhere under it.

References

External links
  
  
 

2020 video games
Adventure games
Fiction about filmmaking
Kadokawa Dwango franchises
Mystery video games
PlayStation 4 games
PQube games
Single-player video games
Video game sequels
Video games developed in Japan
Video games featuring female protagonists
Video games set in Japan
Visual novels